Regina Ip Lau Suk-yee  (Lau; born 24 August 1950) is a Chinese politician. She is currently the Convenor of the Executive Council (ExCo) and a member of the Legislative Council of Hong Kong (LegCo), as well as the founder and current chairperson of the New People's Party. She was formerly a prominent government official of the Hong Kong Special Administrative Region (HKSAR) and was the first woman to be appointed the Secretary for Security to head the disciplinary service. She is also the founder and Chairwoman of Savantas Policy Institute, a think-tank in Hong Kong.

Ip became a controversial figure for her role advocating the passage of the national security legislation to implement Hong Kong Basic Law Article 23, and after this legislation was withdrawn, she became the first principal official to resign from the administration of Chief Executive Tung Chee-hwa. She took a sabbatical to study for a master's degree. She contested the 2007 Hong Kong Island by-election for the Legislative Council but was defeated by Anson Chan in the two-horse race. She ran again in the 2008 Legislative Council election and won, gaining a seat in the Hong Kong Island. She was re-elected in the 2012 and 2016 elections.

Ip is widely known to be keen on the Chief Executive top post. She ran in both 2012 and 2017 Chief Executive elections but did not secure a minimum number of 150 nominations from the 1,200-member Election Committee to enter the race on both occasions. In 2020, Larry Diamond, her supervisor at Stanford University, publicly criticized Ip's handling of the democracy movement and freedom of the press in Hong Kong.

Early life
Ip was born in what was then British Hong Kong in 1950; her father was a Chinese Singaporean trader Lau Fook-seng, and her mother was actress Wa Choi-Fung (華彩鳳), the second wife of her father. She attended St. Stephen's Girls' College, after which she read English literature at the University of Hong Kong, graduating with first-class honours; she later obtained a Master of Letters degree from the University of Glasgow, where she studied Elizabethan poet, Sir Philip Sidney.

Government career
In the 1970s Ip joined the Hong Kong Government as an Administrative Officer. In 1986, she, accompanied by her husband, went to Stanford Graduate School of Business to study for an MS in Management under the Sloan Programme. She took various bureaucratic positions before she was appointed Director of Industry Department in September 1995.

Ministerial career
In August 1996, she was appointed Director of Immigration – a post usually filled by officials from within the Immigration Department. She was the first woman to hold the post, and continued until after the 1997 handover. While she held that post, the UK government decided to grant full British citizenship for 50,000 Hong Kong families. She was also head of immigration during the right of abode saga, when the Hong Kong government requested the National People's Congress in Beijing to intervene after the courts ruled against the government, essentially granting the Hong Kong government the ability to simply ignore the court's ruling after it granted right of abode to the children of Hong Kong residents who held right of abode whether or not those children were born in Hong Kong.

In July 1998, Ip was appointed to the post of Secretary for Security – again, the first woman to hold that post. She became the first government minister to "declare her political stance".

Ip became one of the so-called 14 principal officials and a member of the Executive Council during Tung Chee-hwa's second term in government on 1 July 2002. She was well known at that time as a hawkish, uncompromising figure in the Government, with some describing her as "a staunch, arrogant, authoritarian and yet outspoken bureaucrat". As security minister, she promoted the adoption of the controversial Article 23 of Hong Kong's Basic Law. After massive public protests and the government's withdrawal of the proposed national security legislation, Ip resigned from office on 25 June 2003, citing personal reasons.

Political career
In 2003, Ip returned to Stanford University to pursue a master's degree in East Asian Studies, with Larry Diamond as her supervisor. Her thesis, Hong Kong: Case Study in Democratic Development in Transitional Society, reportedly expressed admiration for a bicameral system and suggested that political parties in Hong Kong be strengthened and be more inclusive. She returned to Hong Kong in 2006. She set up a policy think tank, Savantas Policy Institute, giving rise to media speculation that she was planning to run for the office of Chief Executive sometime in the future. In September 2007, she declared her intention to run for the Legislative Council in the Hong Kong Island by-election. She apologised for her handling of the Article 23 situation, hoped to put it behind her. However, she received only 43% of the vote, defeated by Anson Chan.

Legislative Councillor
Ip ran in the 2008 Hong Kong legislative election in the Hong Kong Island geographical constituency, forming a ticket including dermatologist Louis Shih and two elected District Councillors, Albert Wong and Ronald Chan. Her ticket won a total of 61,073 votes, the second highest on Hong Kong Island and the fourth highest Hong Kong wide. She was sworn in as Legislative Councillor on 8 October 2008.

In January 2011, she launched a middle-class oriented party called New People's Party. The party held two seats in the legislature, herself and Michael Tien, after the 2012 Legislative council election, in which Ip was elected with 30,289 votes, despite losing almost half of the votes. She was subsequently appointed to the Executive Council of Hong Kong by Chief Executive Leung Chun-ying after the election, in which she served until December 2016 when she ran for the Chief Executive for the second time. Her party expanded its district base when it allied with the Civil Force in 2014. Ip was re-elected to the Legislative Council in 2016, with the highest votes of 60,760 in Hong Kong Island.

2012 Chief Executive bid

Ip was known to be interested in the Chief Executive post. She expressed her intention to run in the 2012 election but dropped out on 15 December. Following a number of scandals surrounding Henry Tang, Ip re-announced her candidacy in the race on 20 February. She withdrew her candidacy after failing to receive enough nominations before the deadline and thus did not qualify to stand for the election on 29 February, which made her campaign last for only nine days.

2017 Chief Executive bid

Ip has expressed her intention to consider running in the 2017 Chief Executive election. After incumbent Leung Chun-ying announced he would not seek for re-election, Ip resigned from the Executive Council to launch her campaign. She announced her candidacy on 15 December under the campaign slogan "Win back Hong Kong" after receiving her party's endorsement. She called for a relaunch of the electoral reform process under Beijing's restrictive framework as decreed by the National People's Congress Standing Committee (NPCSC) on 31 August 2020. She also pledged to enact controversial Article 23 with "suitable measures".

Ip got emotional and tear-eyed in a media gathering, "[I]n the past ten years I started from nothing, working hard bit by bit, splashing out my own money, putting in much mental and physical effort," Ip said as her voice shook. "Can you say I had not taken on responsibilities for the Hong Kong society? When I handled Article 23, I did not perform satisfactorily?" she defended herself, "I have taken responsibility under the accountability system and have already apologised multiple times. I was not shameless, I did not hold onto my powers. I stepped down from the administration. I'll leave for society to judge whether I have the guts to take on responsibilities. I definitely have taken on a lot of responsibilities." Ip's remarks came after Leung Chun-ying praised Lam for her "ability and willingness to take on responsibilities" As Carrie Lam declared her candidacy and Tsang was expected to run, political analysts said that could endanger Ip's chances of getting the minimum 150 nominations to enter the race. Ip revealed that two or three electors, including businessman Allan Zeman, have turned their backs on her to support Lam.

Supported by her New People's Party and a few electors from business sectors, Ip also gained a nomination from a pro-democrat elector from the Accountancy subsector, who wished to send Ip into the race to split Lam's votes. However, as Lam aimed to grab more than 600 nominations, Ip faced an uphill battle to secure her nominations. She urged "a certain candidate" not to ask for additional backing since that person had secured more than enough nominations already. Ip withdrew from the election, conceding the number of nominations hours before the nomination deadline on 1 March, for the second time after her 2012 bid. She received the number of nominations "far behind what was needed". She attributed her failure to the restrictive selection process of the 1,200 structure of the Election Committee membership as she was "squeezed out" by the Beijing-supported Lam and democrats-supported Tsang and Woo.

Views
Ip has taken controversial stances during her career including advocating for the Public Order Ordinance and defending government policy denying right of abode to the children of Hong Kong people born in mainland China since the 1997 handover.

Article 23

According to Ku, Ip had turned herself into a provocative political figure due to her departure from the "institutionalised bureaucratic ritual" adopted by civil servants in the past. She spearheaded the government's attempt to codify Hong Kong Basic Law Article 23, and pushed hard for it to be legislated by July 2003. Between September 2002 and July 2003, her popularity plunged. In October 2002, she made a remark about Adolf Hitler at the City University.

Ip downplayed any opposition to the bill, predicting only 30,000 people would show up at the planned demonstration(s). Ip blamed political and religious leaders for creating a "herd mentality". Her popularity plummeted when one remark after another contradicted popular opinion, most notably in regard to her commitment to push the bill despite the commotion and chaos of the SARS outbreak in 2003.

Detractors also took shots at her bushy hairstyle, nicknaming her "Broomhead" (掃把頭). This included a comic book which caricatured her in police uniform and signature bushy hairstyle. She openly admitted that although she disliked the nickname, she would not change her hairstyle just to please her critics. Regarding the controversy she said "I think I would like to be remembered as somebody who was not afraid to speak out, even if that might affect my popularity." Ip later said "I made a mistake in promoting the bill" and apologized for remarks she had made while pushing for Article 23.

Views on democracy
Ip has been criticised for her perceived inconsistent stance toward democracy. Following her return from the United States, she shifted her public position during her campaign for a seat in the legislative assembly in 2007 by saying "the only way forward for Hong Kong is complete democratization", in contrast to her position before. Todd Crowell of the Asia Times referred to her as a "born-again democrat". Anson Chan, her main rival supported by the pro-democracy camp in the 2007 by-election, labelled her a "fake democrat" because of this.

In February 2022, Ip wrote a commentary on SCMP, criticizing Western democracy and saying that "Many continue to indulge in the fallacious fantasy that adopting a procedure for electing our political leaders based on public participation will deliver good governance."

Views on press freedom
In July 2008, Ip was once again embroiled in controversy for her comments about police tactics used against reporters covering the heated scenes in queues for Olympics tickets. In commenting about the man-handling of Hong Kong reporters by the Beijing police, she had said that "neck-shoving [techniques]... were most effective in stopping trouble-makers". The following day, she stated that she supported freedom of the press and apologised for the "slip of the tongue", clarifying that she was neither implying that journalists were troublemakers, nor endorsing the actions of the police. Democratic Party lawmaker Yeung Sum referred to this as a Freudian slip that showed up her true colours.

Allegedly racist comments on Filipino maids
In April 2015, Ip wrote in a controversial article in Ming Pao that she had received complaints while she was Secretary for Security from 1998 to 2003, from "foreign women" in Discovery Bay that the government was "allowing Filipino domestic helpers to seduce their husbands", and was accused of being sexist and racist by many media reports. The Philippines consulate expressed its concern over the "unfortunate choice of words" by Ip. A domestic helpers advocacy group demonstrated in front of her office, calling on her to apologise. She apologised to those who were offended by her and insisted that the article was misinterpreted.

Views on fur wearing
Ip was under fire for wearing a red mink coat to a Legislative Council meeting in January 2016. She defended her clothing choice, saying that "wearing fur is actually the same as eating beef...Mink farming can be more humane than rearing chicken or cattle." She was criticised by animal rights activists.

Lying about Liaison Office visit
On 5 September 2016 one day after the 2016 Hong Kong Legislative Council election in which she was re-elected, Ip's car was photographed at the Liaison Office. She told Ming Pao that she was not in the car and she was sending some books she wrote to her friends there. She later admitted that she lied about it as she was requested by the other party to keep the visit confidential. She was criticised as the pan-democrats had been accusing the Liaison Office for meddling in local politics and elections. She apologised to the public and Ming Pao and denied that she was there for thanking the Liaison Office for its support.

New York Times Op-ed Article, "Hong Kong Is China, Like It or Not" 
On October 1, 2020, the New York Times published an opinion piece by Ip, titled "Hong Kong Is China, Like It or Not". In the piece, Ip defended the Hong Kong Police Force's actions during the 2019–20 Hong Kong protests and publicly supported the Legislative Council of Hong Kong. She also stated that Hong Kong's citizenry should reevaluate the future of the territory.

Mainstream journalists also rejected the article, including Pulitzer Prize winning journalist Mei Fong. The National Review and The Spectator criticized the op-ed, as did HuffPost freelance reporter Yashar Ali and CBS News correspondent Kathryn Watson. American politicians Mitt Romney, Tom Cotton, Guy Reshenthaler and  Mike Gallagher also rejected the article's claims and denounced the New York Times' decision to release the article.

Political authors Antonio Garcia Martinez, Matt Taibbi and Brookings Institution senior fellow Shadi Hamid rejected the article's views, with Hamid stating that it was "what authoritarianism actually looks like". Johns Hopkins School of Advanced International Studies professors Hal Brands and Yascha Mounk rejected the article's premise, with Mounk writing that the op-ed was an example of "systematic racism in American journalism". Council on Foreign Relations senior fellow Meighan Stone expressed that the article depicted a false balance in favor of the Chinese government, specifically referencing the Chinese government's role in the Xinjiang re-education camps and the death of activist Liu Xiaobo. Harvard University Nieman Journalism Lab director Joshua Benton compared the article to Nazi propaganda. Satirical news program China Uncensored also criticized the article, describing it as "lies and communist propaganda".

BN(O) and dual citizenship
In October 2020, SCMP reported that Ip has previously said that if the Chinese foreign ministry imposes restrictions on Hong Kong BN(O) passports, then the Hong Kong Immigration Department may instruct airline companies to stop issuing tickets to those with BN(O) passports. In February 2021, SCMP reported that the move to ban BN(O) passports has left ethnic minorities without a valid passport, as many have encountered issues while applying for a Hong Kong passport. The move would practically stop the freedom of these Hong Kong citizens from leaving Hong Kong.

In January 2021, Ip wrote an opinion article on SCMP, stating that those with dual passports in Hong Kong should choose between their non-Hong Kong citizenship or their right of abode in Hong Kong, saying that those who choose their non-Hong Kong foreign citizenship "could also lose the right of abode in Hong Kong and the attendant right to vote in Hong Kong elections." This is despite the fact that high-level government officials, including Carrie Lam, Tam Yiu-chung, and Tung Chee-hwa have children with foreign citizenship. Ip mentions that her suggestion was just a proposal and she did not raise the issue with the Hong Kong SAR government.

In February 2021, Hong Kong Free Press reported that around 7,000 people had emigrated from Hong Kong to the UK since June 2020, with Ip claiming those people had "no money, skills or education".

In March 2021, Ip said that those in Hong Kong who use the BN(O) passport for working holiday visa applications to 14 countries should be denied the ability to fly on airlines by the government.

Overseas voting 
While discussing a proposal to allow overseas Hong Kongers to vote, Ip gave her reasoning for not allowing all overseas Hong Kongers to vote, and only allowing those living in mainland China to vote. Ip said that under the "One country" principle, those who live in China should get first priority when it comes to overseas voting.

Separation of powers 

In October 2020, Ip claimed that Hong Kong has never had separation of powers, and that government officials should reiterate that the city does not have it.

Expulsion of Legislative Council members 
In November 2020, following the expulsion of 4 pro-democracy lawmakers in the Legislative Council, Ip defended the expulsion and said "They cannot be just democrats in name. They have to not only embrace true democratic values in the sense of respecting the rule of law and the rights of other people with whom they disagree, they also have to respect the sovereignty, security of our country." Additionally, Ip said that "Time will tell that it was the right decision to take."

Arrests of pro-democracy figures 
After the arrest of 53 pro-democracy figures in January 2021, Ip defended the arrests, stating that their goal of taking control of the Legislative Council and not approving the budget would not be tolerated.

Xinjiang 
In March 2021, after some companies suspended the use of cotton from Xinjiang due to human rights concerns, Ip stated that those companies were spreading lies about Xinjiang, and that she would boycott Burberry. Ip claimed that she would not wear products from the brand "until Burberry has retracted or apologised for its unfounded allegations against Xinjiang." After some people asked her to burn her scarves, Ip said that she would just "put them away for the time being".

RTHK 
In 2019, Ip said that RTHK should stop producing news in Chinese. In April 2021, Ip suggested that RTHK be shut down, and said that RTHK staff "often challenge the government's bottom line."

LGBT and women's rights 
Ip has expressed desires to legislate against discrimination against LGBT people and supported the city to host the 2022 Gay Games. She, however, stopped short of supporting the legalisation of same-sex marriage in Hong Kong. On other social issues, such as sexism, Ip has criticised the media for focusing on what she called "focusing on a female politician's hairstyle, clothing and make up" rather than her work and has expressed desire to reserve seats for women in election committees.

COVID-19 
In March 2022, Ip argued that "dynamic zero-Covid" would be necessary in Hong Kong.

In September 2022, Ip said that "It is difficult for the government to come up with a road map for its anti-epidemic strategies now." Ip also dismissed concerns that international businesses had left Hong Kong due to its anti-epidemic policies. In contrast, the Hong Kong General Chamber of Commerce conducted a survey, which showed that 10% of large enterprises had permanently left Hong Kong, and an additional 30% of large enterprises were considering leaving or had left in the first half of 2022. The CEO of the chamber called for an immediate lifting of all anti-epidemic entry restrictions into the city.

Taiwan 
In August 2022, after senior Hong Kong government officials, including John Lee, criticized Nancy Pelosi for visiting Taiwan and threatened to assist Beijing with "all necessary measures" to defend national sovereignty, Ip said ""Those in important positions of the government must share the nation's core values on sovereignty, national security, developmental interests and territorial integrity." However, Ip made a seemingly contradictory statement and said that "Hong Kong has no role to play" in the countermeasures, and also said it was difficult to say how much power Hong Kong had on the issue.

Hong Kong Golf Club 
In August 2022, Ip fought against plans to build public housing on the Fanling golf course, used by the Hong Kong Golf Club, of which Ip is a member. The plan to build housing there was generally favored by the public. Later in the month, Secretary for Development Bernadette Linn said that despite lobbying by Ip and the Hong Kong Golf Club, "The government, at this moment, is still fully committed to implementing this project and we have not changed our mind."

Despite being a member of the exclusive Hong Kong Golf Club, Ip said that she is "not a golfer", stating "I am not a golfer, but the 3 18-hole golf courses at Fanling are among the finest in Asia."

Ip also said "I hope nobody calls the golf club rich and powerful or pins that label on it. Because it is a sport facility after all."

Stamp duty 
In August 2022, Ip proposed waiving double stamp duties for mainland Chinese without right of abode in the city, taxes implemented earlier to cool down demand and prices for housing in Hong Kong. The government, within hours, responded that there were no plans to implement Ip's idea, and said "Regarding reports that the government is considering the relaxation of stamp duties for property, the government clarifies that there has not been discussion on the matter, and points out clearly that there are no relevant plans." Stock prices of property developers jumped on the news, and Ip later said about the contradiction "the Bloomberg headline said the government had been considering it, so it caused some misunderstanding" and that she would "be more careful and explain things more clearly in the future for sure", without issuing an apology.

Paul Chan reaffirmed the government's position, and later announced that there would be "no plan or intention" to reduce measures to cool down demand, against Ip's suggestion.

Global Financial Leaders' Investment Summit 
In October 2022, after several US lawmakers warned US financial executives to not attend the Global Financial Leaders' Investment Summit, Ip said that "There are no human rights abuses in Hong Kong and accusations of export of "illiberal world order" are totally baseless".

Glory to Hong Kong 
In November 2022, Ip said that the national security law has jurisdiction outside of Hong Kong, and that Hong Kong could extradite suspects from South Korea to Hong Kong. Ip made the comments in reference to an incident where Glory to Hong Kong was played in a rugby match in South Korea. In December 2022, Ip said that representatives from Google should be summoned to the Legislative Council to explain why the song was ranked so highly, and that "If they ignore the summons, a warrant can be issued. It’s a criminal offence and offenders can be jailed up to 12 months."

Personal life
Ip married engineer Sammy Ip Man-ho (1935–1997) in 1981. Their marriage was opposed by Sammy Ip's family. Sammy Ip was the son of Ip Ching-ping, founder of the Ching Hing Construction Company. Sammy Ip has a sister, Henrietta, who was a member of the Legislative Council (1982–1991).  The couple has a daughter, Cynthia Ip Wing-yan, who was born in 1989. Sammy Ip died of liver cancer in 1997.

Ip has a personal driver.

Property ownership 
According to Ip's declaration of assets as of January 2022, Ip owns 2 residential units, 4 parking spaces, and 1 industrial unit in Hong Kong.

See also
New People's Party (Hong Kong)
Politics of Hong Kong

Notes

External links

Regina Ip outlines her LegCo agenda

1950 births
Living people
Alumni of the University of Glasgow
Alumni of the University of Hong Kong
Government officials of Hong Kong
Stanford University alumni
Women members of the Executive Council of Hong Kong
Recipients of the Gold Bauhinia Star
New People's Party (Hong Kong) politicians
Members of the Executive Council of Hong Kong
Hong Kong civil servants
Hong Kong Christians
Hong Kong people of Singaporean descent
HK LegCo Members 2008–2012
HK LegCo Members 2012–2016
HK LegCo Members 2016–2021
HK LegCo Members 2022–2025
Hong Kong pro-Beijing politicians
Hong Kong justices of the peace
Female defence ministers
21st-century Hong Kong women politicians